The Unidad de Valor Constante (UVC) was a currency created by the "Ley de Valores" of Ecuador in 1993, and abolished with dollarization in the presidency of Jamil Mahuad on January 9, 2000. It was meant to help deal with the high levels of inflation experienced under the sucre.  The 1 UVC was specified at its introduction (May 28, 1993) to equal 10,000 sucres. Its value was adjusted daily by the "Instituto Nacional de Estadísticas y Censos" (INEC) in line with the rate of inflation.

It had the ISO 4217 currency code ECV.

Currencies of Ecuador
Modern obsolete currencies